Oreste Vilato Marrero Vázquez (born October 31, 1969) is a former professional baseball first baseman. He played parts of two seasons in Major League Baseball for the Los Angeles Dodgers and Montreal Expos, appearing in 42 games during the 1993 and 1996 seasons. After his release from the Dodgers system, Marrero played from 2000 to 2005 in the Atlantic League, primarily with the Bridgeport Bluefish.

References

External links

1969 births
Living people
Albuquerque Dukes players
Arizona League Brewers players
Beloit Brewers players
Boise Hawks players
Bridgeport Bluefish players
El Paso Diablos players
Harrisburg Senators players
Helena Brewers players
Huntsville Stars players
Lancaster Barnstormers players
Los Angeles Dodgers players
Madison Black Wolf players
Major League Baseball first basemen
Major League Baseball players from Puerto Rico
Montreal Expos players
Ottawa Lynx players
Sportspeople from Bayamón, Puerto Rico
Puerto Rican expatriate baseball players in Canada
San Antonio Missions players
Stockton Ports players
Puerto Rican expatriate baseball players in Taiwan
Sinon Bulls players